Greenville Tobacco Warehouse Historic District is a national historic district located at Greenville, Pitt County, North Carolina. The district encompasses seven contributing buildings and one contributing structures in an industrial section of Greenville.  It includes buildings dated from about 1905 to 1947 and notable examples of Art Deco and Italianate style industrial architecture.  Contributing resources are the American Tobacco Company Storage Warehouse #2. (c. 1905); the Prichard-Hughes Warehouse (c. 1905, with c. 1923 addition); the Dail-Ficklen Warehouse (c. 1911, with c. 1923, 1947, and 1963 additions); the Export Leaf Factory (1914, with 1928, 1932, and 1938 additions); the E. B. Ficklen Factory (c. 1916, with additions c. 1923, c. 1925, c. 1945, and c. 1950); the Gorman Warehouse (1927); the Star Warehouse (1930); and the System of CSX Railroad Tracks.

It was listed on the National Register of Historic Places in 1997, with a boundary increase in 1999.

References

Industrial buildings and structures on the National Register of Historic Places in North Carolina
Historic districts on the National Register of Historic Places in North Carolina
Art Deco architecture in North Carolina
Italianate architecture in North Carolina
Buildings and structures in Pitt County, North Carolina
National Register of Historic Places in Greenville, North Carolina
Tobacco buildings in the United States